Willy Van Den Bossche (born 22 January 1949) is a Belgian archer. He competed at the 1980 Summer Olympics and the 1984 Summer Olympics.

References

External links
 

1949 births
Living people
Belgian male archers
Olympic archers of Belgium
Archers at the 1980 Summer Olympics
Archers at the 1984 Summer Olympics
Sportspeople from East Flanders